Radisson Lake is a lake in Clearwater County, Minnesota, in the United States.

Radisson Lake was named for Pierre-Esprit Radisson, a French explorer.

See also
List of lakes in Minnesota

References

Lakes of Minnesota
Lakes of Clearwater County, Minnesota